The Glenn House is a historic home located at Cape Girardeau, Missouri.  It was built in 1883, and is a two-story, Late Victorian style painted brick dwelling. It is topped by cross-gabled and pyramidal roofs.  It features a verandah with Tuscan order columns, turret, and oriel window.  The house has been restored and open to the public by the Historical Association of Greater Cape Girardeau, Inc.

It was listed on the National Register of Historic Places in 1979. It is located in the Courthouse-Seminary Neighborhood Historic District.

References

External links
 Glenn House - official site

Individually listed contributing properties to historic districts on the National Register in Missouri
Houses on the National Register of Historic Places in Missouri
Houses completed in 1883
Historic house museums in Missouri
Museums in Cape Girardeau County, Missouri
Houses in Cape Girardeau County, Missouri
National Register of Historic Places in Cape Girardeau County, Missouri